Eodorcadion ornatum is a species of beetle in the family Cerambycidae. It was described by Faldermann in 1833.

References

Dorcadiini
Beetles described in 1833